Sam Register (born June 16, 1969) is an American television producer, animator, and businessman. He is the president of Warner Bros. Animation, Cartoon Network Studios, and Hanna-Barbera Studios Europe.

Career
Formerly Vice President of Cartoon Network, Register was the brain behind CartoonNetwork.com, which was launched in 1998. After creating CartoonNetwork.com, Register came up with the idea of Cartoon Orbit in 2000. He was the creative director of Cartoon Orbit during 2000 and 2001. Register had his head start at directing toy commercials, before he moved over to Cartoon Network.

He was the creator of Hi Hi Puffy AmiYumi and The Looney Tunes Show, and served as executive producer of Teen Titans and Ben 10. He also served as executive producer for Transformers: Animated, based on the popular Transformers franchise, and Ben 10: Alien Force. He then became the executive producer of Teen Titans Go!, Mike Tyson Mysteries, and Unikitty!

The fictional character, Dr. Samuel Register (from the Teen Titans comics), was named after Sam Register. On August 28, 2020, Register officially became the president of both Warner Bros. Animation and Cartoon Network Studios. Recently, he has been the executive producer of the HBO Max original series, Looney Tunes Cartoons and Jellystone! as well as the Adult Swim original series, Primal. He also served as an executive producer for films like Teen Titans Go! To the Movies and the 2021 live-action/animated Tom and Jerry hybrid movie.

Filmography

Film

Television

References

External links
 
 
 Keynote: Sam Register, Warner Bros. Animation corporative conference at the 2011 MIP Junior screenings
 LinkedIn Profile

1969 births
American television producers
Living people
Warner Bros. people
Cartoon Network Studios people
Warner Bros. Animation people